Ti si mi u krvi is the sixth studio album by Zdravko Čolić, released in 1984.

After five studio albums for Jugoton, this was Čolić's first studio release for a different label as a co-operation project between Diskoton and Kamarad, a newly established privately-owned music label co-owned by Čolić and Goran Bregović.

The title track is one of the most popular ballads of ex-Yugoslav pop music.

Track listing

Cover versions

 The song "Ti si mi u krvi" was covered by Serbian singer Željko Samardžić, on his 1998 covers album "Nostalgija"
 A cover version of the same song was released in 2011, by Bosnian hard-rock band Teška industrija, as the first single of their covers album "Bili smo raja".

Sampling
 The chorus melody of the song "Ti možeš sve al' jedno ne" is used for the Hari Mata Hari's 1989 song "Ti znaš sve" and the Cher's 1998 song "Believe".
 Also, the same chorus melody as in the song "Ti si mi u krvi" is used for the Ana Stanić's 1998 song "Sama", fourteen years later.

References

1984 albums
Zdravko Čolić albums
Diskoton albums